The 1983 Sugar Bowl was the 49th edition of the college football bowl game, played at the Louisiana Superdome in New Orleans, Louisiana, on Saturday, January 1. Part of the 1982–83 bowl game season, it matched the undefeated and top-ranked Georgia Bulldogs of the Southeastern Conference (SEC) and the #2 Penn State Nittany Lions, an independent. Penn State  to finish atop the final polls as

Teams

Penn State

Georgia

Game summary
The game kicked off shortly after 7 p.m. CST, televised by ABC, at the same time as the Orange Bowl on NBC.

Both teams scored on their first possession of the game. Penn State running back Curt Warner scored on a 2-yard touchdown run and the Nittany Lions  He finished the game with 117 yards rushing. Georgia got on the board following a 27-yard field goal from Kevin Butler to make 

In the second quarter, after two possessions for each team had ended in punts, Nick Gancitano kicked a 38-yard field goal to put the Nittany Lions ahead, 10–3.

After a 65-yard punt return by Kevin Baugh only resulted in a missed field goal for Penn State, Warner added a 9-yard touchdown run on a 65-yard drive that took just under two minutes. With only 44 seconds left in the first half, Gancitano made a 45-yard field goal for Penn State to take a commanding 20–3 lead.

After the ensuing kick-off, however, quarterback John Lastinger drove the Bulldogs down the field, completing four of five passes, including one that Kevin Harris lateralled to Herschel Walker for a 26-yard gain. With five seconds remaining in the half, Lastinger threw a 10-yard touchdown pass to Herman Archie to cut the margin  

Opening the second half, Georgia mounted a 64-yard drive, which was capped when Herschel Walker scored on a 1-yard touchdown run, cutting the margin to 20–17. Georgia had thus scored touchdowns on consecutive possessions (one to end the first half and one to open the second), with Penn State only touching the ball intermittently to run out the clock in the first half. However, the Bulldogs wouldn't score again for almost 22 minutes of game time and John Lastinger went on to throw two interceptions.

Penn State cashed in on the second one with a 47-yard play-action touchdown pass from Todd Blackledge to wide receiver Gregg Garrity to give Penn State a  Lastinger threw a 9-yard touchdown pass to Clarence Kay to close the margin to 27–23 with 3:54 left. After the subsequent kick-off, however, Penn State was able to run out the clock, only having to punt as time was expiring.

Scoring summary

Statistics

References

Sugar Bowl
Sugar Bowl
Georgia Bulldogs football bowl games
Penn State Nittany Lions football bowl games
Sugar Bowl
Sugar Bowl